Fürstenstein (Fichtelgebirge) is a mountain of Bavaria, Germany.

Mountains of Bavaria